Longa is a town and commune in the municipality of Cuito Cuanavale, province of Cuando Cubango, Angola.

References

Populated places in Cuando Cubango Province
Communes in Cuando Cubango Province